Rebati Mohan Das is an Indian politician from Bharatiya Janata Party and a member of Tripura Legislative Assembly. Das was the speaker of Tripura Legislative Assembly, until his resignation in September 2021.

References 

Year of birth missing (living people)
Living people
Tripura politicians
Bharatiya Janata Party politicians from Tripura
Tripura MLAs 2018–2023